Daniel Porter (born 13 February 1992), known professionally as Daniel Portman, is a Scottish actor. He is best known for playing the role of Podrick Payne in the television series Game of Thrones (2012–2019).

Early life
Portman is the son of actor Ron Donachie and Fiona Biggar, and has a sister Naomi. He was born in Glasgow and grew up in Strathbungo on the city's Southside. He attended Shawlands Academy, where he played rugby and was named Head Boy. He then pursued a Higher National Certificate (HNC) in Acting at Reid Kerr College in Paisley.

Career
Portman has been acting since he was 16 years old. His first role was in 2010's Outcast, in which he starred as Paul. This was followed by a role in popular Scottish soap opera River City. His second film role was a small part in Scottish comedy The Angels' Share. It was announced on 24 August 2011 that he was cast as Podrick Payne in the award-winning HBO fantasy drama series Game of Thrones. He portrayed this role from the second season to the final season. He contributed vocals to a version of the track "Jenny's Song" that featured in the episode "A Knight of the Seven Kingdoms".

Filmography

Film

Television

References

External links
 

Living people
1992 births
21st-century Scottish male actors
Male actors from Glasgow
People educated at Shawlands Academy
People from Govanhill and Crosshill
Scottish male film actors
Scottish male stage actors
Scottish male television actors